Nick Wyman (born May 18, 1950) is an American stage, television, and film actor, and is a former president of the Actors' Equity Association.

Early life and education
Wyman was born in Portland, Maine and raised in Summit, New Jersey and attended Harvard University.

Career
Wyman received his big break as Freddy in the 1981 revival of My Fair Lady which starred original Higgins Sir Rex Harrison. He later created the role of Firmin in the Broadway production of The Phantom of the Opera. He featured in Die Hard with a Vengeance as Hungarian terrorist and explosive expert Mathias Targo. In 2008, he was cast as John Barsad in the Broadway musical adaptation of A Tale of Two Cities, at the Al Hirschfeld Theatre in New York. He was elected President of Actors Equity in May 2010 and served until 2015.

Personal life
He is the older brother of voice actor Oliver Wyman.

Filmography

Film

Television

References

External links
Official Site
A Tale of Two Cities

1950 births
Harvard University alumni
Living people
Male actors from Portland, Maine
People from Summit, New Jersey
Male actors from New Jersey
Presidents of the Actors' Equity Association